William Harold Ingham (1882 – after 1915) was a footballer who played in the Football League for Bristol City and Gainsborough Trinity, and the Southern League for West Ham United, Plymouth Argyle and Norwich City. He was a centre forward.

Life and career
Ingham began his career with Aberdare Athletic before joining West Ham United in 1903. He made two league appearances in one season with the club and then returned to Aberdare. In April 1905, Ingham played for Aberdare in the Welsh Cup final against Wrexham. He was signed by Bristol City later that year, where he played in one league game. In 1906, he joined Gainsborough Trinity and scored seven goals in 28 league appearances for the club. Having moved to Plymouth Argyle the following year, Ingham was the club's top goalscorer in his first season. He made 80 appearances for Argyle in all competitions and scored 20 goals before joining Accrington Stanley in 1909.

He went on to play for Norwich City and was twice selected to play for the Southern League representative side. Together with Norwich team-mate Percy Sutcliffe, Ingham signed professional forms with North-Eastern League club Darlington in 1914. He scored 18 goals in league competition in the 1914–15 season and scored once from five appearances in the FA Cup. Competitive football was suspended in 1915 due to the First World War and there is no record of Ingham resuming his career after the conflict.

References

1882 births
Association football forwards
Aberdare Athletic F.C. players
West Ham United F.C. players
Bristol City F.C. players
Gainsborough Trinity F.C. players
Plymouth Argyle F.C. players
Accrington Stanley F.C. (1891) players
Norwich City F.C. players
Darlington F.C. players
English Football League players
Southern Football League players
Western Football League players
Year of death missing
English footballers